Mawlay Muhammad bin Abd al-Rahman, known as Muhammad IV, born in Fes in 1803 and died in Marrakesh in 1873, was the Sultan of Morocco from 28 August 1859 to 16 September 1873 as a ruler of the 'Alawi dynasty. He was proclaimed sultan after the death of his father, Abd al-Rahman. His reign marked a series of reform to tackle European influence on Morocco, as Ottoman Algeria had just been conquered by France in 1830, leading to European nations entering military conflicts with Morocco, such as the Battle of Isly with France in 1844 and the Battle of Tetuan with Spain in 1860. He was succeeded by his son Hassan I.

Biography

Military commander 

Born in 1803 in Fes, Mawlay Muhammad was a son of the 'Alawi sultan of Morocco Abd al-Rahman. During his father's reign, neighbouring Ottoman Algeria was invaded by France in 1830, and Muhammad commanded the Moroccan army which was defeated by the French at the Battle of Isly in August 1844.

After the defeat, with his father's permission, Mawlay Muhammad used his capacity as army chief to launch a series of significant military reforms in 1845. He invited a group of officers from Ottoman Tunisia who had served in the Ottoman army to raise and train the first European-style regiment, the askari, as a supplement to the usual palace guards ('abid) and tribal troops ( and ). Muhammad IV set up the Madrasa of al-Muhandiseen, a military engineering school in Fes, supervised by the renegade French Count Joseph de Saulty (an artillery officer from Algiers, de Saulty defected after an amorous entanglement, and converted, taking up the name Abd al-Rahman al-Ali). Muhammad IV hired writers to translate various European textbooks on engineering and science. He was personally involved in the translation of the works of scientists such as Legendre, Newton and Lalande. He also struck deals with British Gibraltar and Egypt to receive regular contingents of Moroccan soldiers for artillery training.

Sultan

Hispano-Moroccan War 

Immediately upon ascension to throne in August 1859, Muhammad IV was faced with his first test, the Spanish-Moroccan War under Isabella II of Spain. Raids by irregular tribesmen on the Spanish enclaves of Ceuta and Melilla in northwest Morocco prompted Spain to demand an expansion of the borders of its enclave around Ceuta. When this was refused by Muhammad IV, Spain declared war. The Spanish navy bombarded Tangier, Asilah and Tetuan. A large Spanish expeditionary force landed in Ceuta, which subsequently went on to defeat the Moroccan army at the Battle of Tétouan in February 1860. The Treaty of Wad Ras signed in April 1860 expanded the enclaves, but more worrisomely imposed a large indemnity payment on Morocco of 100 million francs, twenty times the government's budget. Provisions allowed the Spanish to hold Tetouan until it was paid. The treaty also ceded the enclave of Sidi Ifni to Spain.

Aftermath 

After the disappointment of defeat and the crushing financial burden of the Spanish treaty, Muhammad IV gradually retired into passivity, dedicating himself to scholarly and intellectual interests in mathematics, geometry, astronomy, poetry and music, and leaving political affairs to be handled by his palace slave and effective vizier, Si Moussa.

As by the Treaty of Tangier in 1863, half of the customs duties of all Moroccan ports were designated to pay the Spanish debt, the Alawite sultan's government (the Makhzen) was faced with a critical financial situation, and launched the process of "qaidization". Traditionally, the Makhzen had an understanding with the semi-autonomous rural tribes, whereby the tribal leaders agreed to hand over a portion of the taxes they collected and to supply tribesmen to the sultan's army in times of war, but otherwise were left to manage their own affairs. The new financial difficulties from the colonial encroachment prompted the Makhzen to demand ever-greater exactions of troops and taxes from the tribes. As the tribes balked and began to refuse the higher taxes, the sultan decided to circumvent the elected tribal leaders, refusing to ratify their credentials, and instead appointed qaids of his own choosing, imposing them upon the tribes. The qaids were rarely of the same tribal stock as the tribes they governed, but were instead ambitious men, chosen primarily for their ruthless ability to crush rebellion and force the tribes to cough up. Initially designed as a centralizing move, this eventually backfired, as the qaids, once esconsed in their tribal fiefs, proved even more ungovernable than the amghars had ever been. During Muhammad IV's reign, Morocco began essentially careening into feudalism, a process that accelerated during the reign of his successor, Hassan I.

Reform 
Following the military defeats at Isly and Tetuan, a new Moroccan army was introduced, 'Askar Nizami. Well-equipped infantry were created, along with modern artillery. A steam engine was built in the palace in Marrakesh in 1863, and the first state-sponsored printing press was introduced to Morocco in 1865. By 1868, over three thousand books, mostly religious instructions, were printed on the lithographic press in Fes. The 'Askar Nizami was subsequently reconstituted by Muhammad IV, who equipped the army with up-to-date weapons supplied by a munitions factory in Marrakesh. A military training school was built at Dar al-Makhzen in Fes, and he searched for Muslim military instructors from Algiers and Tunis to train the new army, rather than Europeans. Muhammad IV's reforms were met with minimal opposition from the Ulama.

Death 
On 11 September 1873, Muhammad IV drowned during a boating activity on one of the water basins of the Agdal Gardens in Marrakesh. He was buried in the Mausoleum of Moulay Ali Cherif (near present-day Rissani) in the Tafilalt.

See also
 List of Sultans of Morocco
 History of Morocco
 'Alawi dynasty

References

 Abun-Nasr, J.M. (1987) A History of the Maghrib in the Islamic Period. Cambridge, UK: Cambridge University Press
 Laroui, A. (1989) "Morocco from the Beginning of the Nineteenth century to 1880" in J.F. Ade Ajayi, editor, Africa in the Nineteenth Century until the 1880s. Paris: UNESCO. pp.478-96
 Martinière, H.M.P. de la (1889) Morocco, journeys in the kingdom of Fez and to the court of Mulai Hassan. London: Whittaker online
 Park, T.K. and A. Boum (1996) Historical Dictionary of Morocco. Lanham, Md: Scarecrow
 Pennell, C. (2000) Morocco since 1830: a history. New York: New York University Press.
 Morocco Alaoui dynasty
 History of Morocco

1802 births
1873 deaths
19th-century Arabs
'Alawi dynasty
Sultans of Morocco
People from Fez, Morocco
19th-century Moroccan people
19th-century monarchs in Africa